Podbornaya is a rural locality (a selo) and the administrative center of Ivanovskoye Rural Settlement, Ilyinsky District, Perm Krai, Russia. The population was 5 as of 2010.

Geography 
Podbornaya is located 18 km northwest of Ilyinsky (the district's administrative centre) by road. Tikhonovshchina is the nearest rural locality.

References 

Rural localities in Perm Krai
Populated places in Ilyinsky District, Perm Krai